Bermondsey may refer to :

 Bermondsey, an area in London
 Metropolitan Borough of Bermondsey, a Metropolitan borough in the County of London (1900–1965)
 Bermondsey (UK Parliament constituency), a Parliamentary constituency (1885–1918 and 1950–1983)
 Bermondsey West (UK Parliament constituency), one of the two constituencies created from Bermondsey (1918–1950)
 Southwark and Bermondsey (UK Parliament constituency), largely replacing Bermondsey (1983–1997)
 North Southwark and Bermondsey (UK Parliament constituency), replacing the previous (1997–2010)
 Bermondsey and Old Southwark (UK Parliament constituency), replacing the previous (since 2010)
 Bermondsey (parish), a parish in the metropolitan area of London also known as St. Mary Magdalen, Bermondsey
 Bermondsey tube station, a London Underground station
 Bermondsey, Toronto, an industrial area in Toronto, Canada and named after local roadway Bermondsey Drive
 Bermondsey Drive is a roadway in Toronto and named for the location of former Peek Freans global head office in London
 Bermondsey, Barque, a 506-ton barque carrying many emigrants around the world in the 1840s and 1850s